Judith "Jutta" Heine (born 16 September 1940) is a retired West German sprinter. She competed in the 200 metres and 4 × 100 metres relay events at the 1960 and 1964 Olympics and won two silver medals in 1960. In 1964 she finished fifth in the relay and was disqualified in the 200 m heats for false starts. In 1962 Heine won one gold and two silver medals at the European Championships and was selected as West German Sportswoman of the Year. Domestically she held West German national titles in 200 m (1959 and 1961–63), 100 m (1962) and pentathlon (1960 and 1962).

Besides athletics, Heine was an amateur harness race driver and has a degree in finances.
She didn't participate in 1960 olympics third athletic race

References

1940 births
Living people
People from Stadthagen
Sportspeople from Lower Saxony
German female sprinters
German female hurdlers
German pentathletes
West German female sprinters
West German female hurdlers
West German pentathletes
Olympic athletes of the United Team of Germany
Olympic silver medalists for the United Team of Germany
Olympic silver medalists in athletics (track and field)
Athletes (track and field) at the 1960 Summer Olympics
Athletes (track and field) at the 1964 Summer Olympics
Medalists at the 1960 Summer Olympics
Universiade medalists in athletics (track and field)
Universiade gold medalists for West Germany
Medalists at the 1963 Summer Universiade
European Athletics Championships medalists
Japan Championships in Athletics winners